USS Sea Poacher (SS/AGSS-406), a , was a vessel of the United States Navy named for the sea poacher, a slender, mailed fish of the North Atlantic.

Sea Poacher (SS-406) was built by the Portsmouth Navy Yard in Kittery, Maine; launched on 20 May 1944; sponsored by Mrs. J. H. Spiller, wife of Commander Spiller, hull superintendent at the Navy Yard; and commissioned on 31 July 1944.

World War II 

Following underway trials, training, and shakedown in the Portsmouth, New Hampshire, and New London, Connecticut, areas, Sea Poacher transited the Panama Canal and arrived at Pearl Harbor on 25 October 1944. Although her first two war patrols were unproductive, during the third, conducted in the Kuril Islands area, Sea Poacher torpedoed and sank a Japanese trawler and, four days later, sent two fishing boats to the bottom in a surface attack. During the latter action, three crewmen were injured when the 20 millimeter gun exploded. Due to the seriousness of their injuries, the patrol was terminated ahead of schedule, and the submarine returned to Midway.

After conducting her fourth war patrol off the eastern coast of Honshū and Hokkaidō, Sea Poacher was undergoing refitting at Pearl Harbor when the war ended on 15 August 1945.

1946 – 1974 

From 1946 to 1949, Sea Poacher was based at Balboa, Canal Zone, as a unit of Submarine Squadron 6 (SubRon 6) engaging in fleet exercises and antisubmarine training, and, on 1 June 1949, was transferred to Key West, Florida, as a unit of SubRon 4. In 1951, the submarine became the first GUPPY IA conversion performed at the Charleston Naval Shipyard.

For the remainder of her 25-year career, Sea Poacher operated for the most part in the Key West and Caribbean areas, providing services to various units of the Atlantic Fleet with time out for tours of duty with the 6th Fleet in the Mediterranean and various exercises with NATO forces. On 10 July 1952, while operating in the Key West area, the submarine had the unique experience of rescuing a blimp which had suffered an engine casualty and was floating helplessly in the water. The submarine promptly came to the aid of the stricken airship and proceeded to tow it the  back to its base at Naval Air Station, Boca Chica, Florida.

In July 1959, Sea Poacher was transferred to SubRon 12, also based at Key West, and continued to serve as a unit of this squadron for the remainder of her active service. In the fall of 1962, Sea Poacher was deployed with other Atlantic Fleet units maintaining the quarantine imposed on Cuba during the missile crisis.

In 1969, Sea Poacher concluded her service with a -month deployment to the eastern and northern Atlantic areas to participate in antisubmarine training exercises with units of the Spanish and Portuguese navies. Upon returning to Key West, the submarine operated locally and in the Caribbean until 20 October when she set sail for Philadelphia and in-activation. Sea Poacher was reclassified an Auxiliary Submarine AGSS-406 on 1 November, decommissioned on 15 November 1969, and was assigned to the Atlantic Reserve Fleet at Philadelphia. On 30 June 1971, she reassumed the designation of a fleet submarine (SS). On 15 August 1973, her name was struck from the Navy List, and the submarine was sold to Peru in July 1974.

BAP La Pedrera (S-49) 
Sea Poacher was transferred (sold) under terms of the Security Assistance Program, to Peru, 1 July 1974. She was commissioned into the Peruvian Navy, initially as BAP Pabellón de Pica (S-49), but her name was changed a few weeks later to La Pedrera. She was taken out of service in 1995, and relegated to pierside training.

Honors and awards
As Sea Poacher, she received four battle stars for World War II service.

References

External links 

seapoacher.com: USS Sea Poacher Association Official Website

 

Balao-class submarines
Ships built in Kittery, Maine
1944 ships
World War II submarines of the United States
Cold War submarines of the United States
Ships transferred from the United States Navy to the Peruvian Navy
Balao-class submarines of the Peruvian Navy